The Ohio County Commission is the legislature of Medina County, Ohio. Located in Medina, Ohio, the commission represents approximately 179,746 people. The current President of the Board is Colleen M. Swedyk. The Commission currently consists of 3 Republicans.

Board Members have 4 year terms, being elected in a staggered fashion every four years; the President of the Board was elected in 2018, whereas the Vice President of the Board and the other member of the Board where elected in 2016.

References

External links
 Medina County Website
 Medina County Resolutions

Medina County, Ohio